Streptomyces murinus is a bacterium species from the genus of Streptomyces which has been isolated from soil. Streptomyces murinus produces the actinomycin X complex and glucose isomerase Streptomyces murinus can be used for its production of glucose isomerase in the food industry. Streptomyces murinus produces lankamycin and lankacidin.

Further reading

See also 
 List of Streptomyces species

References

External links
Type strain of Streptomyces murinus at BacDive -  the Bacterial Diversity Metadatabase

murinus
Bacteria described in 1959